Friedrich Klose (born 29 November 1862 in Karlsruhe, Germany; died 24 December 1942 in Ruvigliana, Switzerland) was a German composer. He studied with Vinzenz Lachner in Karlsruhe, and then with Anton Bruckner in Vienna, and recorded his impressions of his time with Bruckner in a book. His Mass in d-minor was written in response to Franz Liszt's death. His opera Ilsebill (1903) is inspired by the music of Richard Wagner and Richard Strauss, and the plot is based on the Brothers Grimm tale of a fisherman who catches a huge fish which grants ever increasingly more greedy wishes and this is reflected in the increasing complexity of orchestration during the opera. It was premiered in 1903 in Karlsruhe under the direction of Felix Mottl. He ended his career as a composer and a teacher in 1919 and retired to Switzerland.

Works

Works for Stage 
Ilsebill, an opera; Libretto: Hugo Hoffmann (1902, UA Karlsruhe 7. Juni 1903)

Works for Chorus 
Asklepiadische Strophen for men's chorus (text by Heinrich Leuthold, 1888)

Mass in d-minor for Solo voices, chorus, orchestra and organ, op. 6 (1889) for which the following works were written later:

 Andante religioso op. 9 (Orchestral Intermezzo for his Mass op. 6, 1894)
 Vidi Aquam op. 10 (Preulde for his Mass op. 6, 1894)
 Ave Maria for Soprano and Orchestra, op. 11 (Interlude for his Mass op. 6, 1894)
 O Salutaris Hostia for Soprano, Tenor and Orchestra op. 12 (Offertory for his Mass op. 6, 1894)

Four Songs for men's chorus (1905)

Die Wallfahrt nach Kevlaar, a ballade for narrator, three choirs, orchestra and organ (text by Heinrich Heine, 1911)

Ein Festgesang Neros for tenor, chorus , orchestra and organ (text by Victor Hugo, 1912)

Der Sonne-Geist, Oratorio for solo voices, chorus, orchestra and organ (text by Alfred Mombert, 1917)

Songs 
14 Songs for voice and piano opus numbers 1-5 (1886-87)

Verbunden, Song cycle for Mezzo-soprano and piano, op. 8 (text by Friedrich Rückert, 1888)

Fünf Gesänge nach Giordano Bruno for voice and piano (1918)

Orchestral music 
Jeanne d'Arc, tone poem (before 1881)

Loreley, tone poem (before 1881)

Elfenreigen (1892)

Festzug (1892)

Das Leben ein Traum, tone poem for narrator and a final chorus for women's choir (1896)

Instrumental Chamber Music 
Elegie for Violin or Viola and Piano, op. 7 (1889)

Prelude and Double-fugue in c-minor using a theme by Anton Bruckner with a final chorale for brass (1907)

String quartet in E-flat major: "Ein Tribut in vier Raten entrichtet an Seine Gestrengen den deutschen Schulmeister" (1911) Sound bites and work description

Writing 
Meine Lehrjahre bei Bruckner. 1927.

Bayreuth. Eindrücke und Erlebnisse. 1929.

References

External links

Klose's Opera, Ilsebill

1862 births
1942 deaths
German opera composers
Male opera composers
German male classical composers
String quartet composers